Ohio Assembly Plant, or "OHAP", is a Ford Motor Company factory located in Avon Lake, Ohio. The 3,700,000 square foot plant sits on 419 acres and opened in 1974 to produce the Ford Econoline/E-Series van. It produced the Mercury Villager and Nissan Quest from 1993 through 2002, and the Ford Escape and Mercury Mariner until 2005. Ford E-Series van production stopped at the end of 2013 as Ford replaced the E-Series with the uni-body Ford Transit, which will be produced at Ford's facility in Kansas City, MO.  The cutaway and strip chassis E-Series continues in production here for heavy duty applications. In Spring 2015, production of the Ford F-650 and F-750 began. In the summer of 2016, production of the 2017 standard cab F-350, 450 and 550 began.

As of 2017, the plant has over 1,700 employees.

In 2017, Ohio Assembly received the coveted Q1 Quality Award for highest build quality off the assembly line.

Products made
Ford E-Series (Econoline) Cutaway/Strip Chassis (1975–present)
Ford F-650/F-750 (2015–present)
Ford Super Duty (2016–present)

Past
Ford Econoline/E-Series (1974-2014)
Mercury Villager (1993-2003)
Nissan Quest (1993-2003)
Ford Escape (2004-2005)
Mercury Mariner (2005-2006)

References

External links
 Ohio Assembly

Ford factories
Buildings and structures in Lorain County, Ohio
Motor vehicle assembly plants in Ohio